The Ridgeway is a suburb just outside of Queanbeyan, New South Wales, Australia. People commonly mistake it for being a part of Queanbeyan, but it is part of the Queanbeyan-Palerang region, not the city of Queanbeyan. It is located on a ridge to the east of the central business district (CBD) on the Kings Highway. When it was established it was part of the Yarrowlumla Shire.

References

Queanbeyan
Southern Tablelands